The Timor-Leste Solidarity Medal is a state decoration of East Timor awarded to international security forces for their contribution to stability and peace operations in East Timor during the INTERFET operation, and following the 2006 East Timorese crisis.

Criteria
Personnel may be awarded the medal if they meet personnel and time qualifications.  Personnel eligible are military or police personnel who have served on a mandated mission assisting with peace and stability operations.  Military or Police personnel may also be eligible if they were posted to a recognised bilateral support mission to East Timor.

Personnel must have served a minimum of 180 continuous or accrued days of service in East Timor from 1 May 2006. Personnel may also be nominated who served a minimum of 120 days from 1 May 2006, or who served with a start date in May or June 2006 for a period at least 90 days. The President of East Timor may also consider extraordinary circumstances for those who are outside of mandated time periods. Applications for extraordinary cases are approved and submitted through national missions to be considered and approved by the president. Notification of approved cases will be returned in writing.

Appearance
The medal is circular and silver in colour, 38 mm in diameter, with a raise rim. The obverse depict the map of the country in relief.  It is inscribed TIMOR-LESTE above and SOLIDARIEDADE below. The reverse bears the Coat of Arms of East Timor with the inscription of REPUBLICA DEMOCRATICA DE TIMOR-LESTE arching above and the letters RDTL below. The medal is suspended from a ribbon of black, white, yellow, and red. These colors are the same as the country's flag.  The medal is manufactured by Cash's International of Melbourne, Australia.

Recipients 
 Stuart Mayer
 Michael Slater (general)
 Simon Stuart (general)

See also
 Orders, decorations, and medals of Timor-Leste
 New Zealand General Service Medal 2002 (Timor-Leste)
 United Nations Medal for the United Nations Integrated Mission in Timor-Leste (UNMIT)

References

External links
 Obverse of the Medal, New Zealand Defence Force website
 Reverse of the Medal, New Zealand Defence Force website

Orders, decorations, and medals of East Timor
Awards established in 2009
2009 establishments in East Timor
United Nations operations in East Timor